Wuxi Christian Church, formerly Holy Cross Church, is a Protestant church located in Liangxi District of Wuxi, Jiangsu, China.

History
In 1901, American Episcopal Church Pastor Rev. Cameron MacRae (Mai Ganlin) and Zhu Baoyuan, a Chinese staff of the Episcopal Church, introduced Protestantism to Wuxi and founded the Anglican Church of Wuxi later. Preacher Mu Gaowen bought 26 acres of land here in 1908 to build a church. In 1915 they received a large donation from an American believer and enlarged the church.

In 1958 it was renamed "Wuxi Christian Church". During the Cultural Revolution, it was used as school classrooms. After the 3rd Plenary Session of the 11th Central Committee of the Communist Party of China, according to the national policy of free religious belief, the church was officially reopened to the public in 1980. In January 1994 it was designated as a municipal level cultural relic preservation unit by the local government. The church was inscribed to the Cultural Relics Protection Units List in Jiangsu in March 2019.

Gallery

References

Further reading
 

Churches in Jiangsu
Former Anglican churches in China
Tourist attractions in Wuxi
1915 establishments in China
Protestant churches in China
Churches completed in 1915